The 2016 Newfoundland and Labrador Scotties Tournament of Hearts, the women's provincial curling championship for Newfoundland and Labrador, was held from January 28 to 30 at the Re/Max Centre (the St. John's Curling Club) in St. John's, Newfoundland and Labrador. The winning Stacie Curtis team represented Newfoundland and Labrador at the 2016 Scotties Tournament of Hearts in Grande Prairie, Alberta.

Teams
Teams are as follows:

Round-robin standings

No playoff was necessary, as Team Curtis went through the round robin undefeated.

Round-robin results

January 28
Draw 1
Curtis 7-5 Strong

Draw 2
Curtis 8-6 Hardy

January 29
Draw 3
Hardy 10-3 Strong

Draw 4
Curtis 7-4 Strong

January 30
Draw 5
Curtis 7-1 Hardy

Draw 6
Hardy vs. Strong (not played)

References

External links
Scores

2016 Scotties Tournament of Hearts
Sport in St. John's, Newfoundland and Labrador
Curling in Newfoundland and Labrador
2016 in Newfoundland and Labrador